R. Ramachandran (1923–2005) was a Malayalam–language poet from Kerala state, South India.

Biography
Born in 1923 in Thamarathiruthi village in Thrissur district of Kerala, Ramachandran studied in various schools of the erstwhile Kingdom of Cochin and obtained his graduation and masters in literature from Maharajas College, Ernakulam. He taught Malayalam in Malabar Christian College, Kozhikode from 1948 until his retirement in 1978. He was a scholar in Sanskrit, English and Malayalam languages. Though not a prolific poet, Ramachandran had an impact in Malayalam poetry with his works such as Murali, Sandhya Nikunjangal, Shyama Sundari and Pinne. An anthology of his poems titled R. Ramachandrante Kavithakal received the Sahitya Akademi Award in 2000 and the Kerala Sahitya Akademi Award in 2003.

References

1923 births
2005 deaths
People from Thrissur district
Poets from Kerala
Malayalam-language writers
Malayalam poets
Recipients of the Kerala Sahitya Akademi Award
Recipients of the Sahitya Akademi Award in Malayalam
Indian Sanskrit scholars
Academic staff of Malabar Christian College
Maharaja's College, Ernakulam alumni
20th-century Indian poets
Indian male poets
20th-century Indian male writers